Acrocomia aculeata is a species of palm native to the Neotropics.

Common names
Common names include grugru palm, gloo gloo, corojo, macaúba palm, coyol palm, and macaw palm; synonyms include A. lasiospatha, A. sclerocarpa, and A. vinifera.

Description

It grows up to 15–20 m tall, with a trunk up to 50 cm in diameter, characterized by numerous slender, black, viciously sharp 10 cm long spines jutting out from the trunk. The leaves are pinnate, 3–4 m long, with numerous slender, 50–100 cm long leaflets. Petioles of the leaves are also covered with spines.  The flowers are small, produced on a large branched inflorescence 1.5 m long. The fruit is a yellowish-green drupe 2.5–5 cm in diameter. The inner fruit shell, also called endocarp, is very tough to break and contains usually one single, dark brown, nut-like seed 1–2 cm in diameter. The inside of the seed, also called endosperm, is a dry white filling that has a vaguely sweet taste like coconut when eaten. The fruit turns yellow when ripe and has a hard outer shell. The pulp is slightly sweet and is extremely slimy and sticky.

Distribution and habitat
The species is found from southern Mexico and the Caribbean south to Paraguay and northern Argentina.

Ecology
The tree was noted by the English naturalist Henry Walter Bates in his 1863 book The Naturalist on the River Amazons, where he wrote that

Uses

The plants inhabit a wide variety of climates and situations; in Paraguay, for example, where it is ubiquitous, it is called the coco paraguayo (Paraguayan coconut), as it is much less common in the rest of the world. It has been suggested that grugru nuts, which come in mass numbers from each tree, can be used in the manufacture of biodiesel. The grugru nut, while very hard, can be sliced into thin circles to be sanded and worn as rings.  The trunk of the palm can also be 'milked' to yield a fermented alcoholic beverage known as coyol wine.

References

Germplasm Resources Information Network: Acrocomia
PACSOA: Acrocomia aculeata
Project for Neotropical Fruits: Acrocomia aculeata
 Leuphana Universität, Lüneburg (2013) Macauba - Sustainable Palm Oil

External links

 Acrocomia research at the University of Hohenheim

aculeata
Flora of Mexico
Flora of the Caribbean
Flora of Central America
Flora of South America
Flora of Brazil
Flora of Paraguay
Flora of Argentina
Flora of the Cerrado
Plants described in 1763
Flora without expected TNC conservation status